Giorgos Panagi (born November 3, 1986 in Larnaca) is a retired Cypriot footballer.

He is best known for scoring a goal in Anorthosis' famous draw with Internazionale becoming the first Cypriot player to score for a Cypriot side in a Champions League group stage match.

Honours
Anorthosis Famagusta
Cypriot First Division: 2007-08
Omonia
Cypriot Championship: 2010
Cypriot Cup: 2011
Cyprus FA Shield: 2010

External links
 

1986 births
Living people
People from Larnaca
Cypriot footballers
Association football midfielders
Cyprus international footballers
Nea Salamis Famagusta FC players
Anorthosis Famagusta F.C. players
AC Omonia players
Alki Larnaca FC players
Anagennisi Deryneia FC players
Omonia Aradippou players
Cypriot First Division players